The Journey is the debut extended play album by American country singer Jamie Lynn Spears.  "How Could I Want More" was released as the album's lead single on November 26, 2013 by Sweet Jamie Music, Inc. On May 13, 2014, Spears released teasers of four new songs ("Shotgun Wedding", "Mandolin Summer Sun", "Big Bad World", and "Run") on her Instagram account with the hashtag, "JLSTheJourney." The Journey was released on May 27, 2014.

Background
For a couple of years prior to the release of The Journey Spears had spent time writing songs, working with different producers, demoing songs, and "trying to figure out what the exact sound" that she wanted to put into the EP.  Spears stated that her first impression as an artist was important to her. She said of her fans, "My fans have been so supportive, and have been so patient for me to get the music to them. They have heard all the YouTube clips, and my live shows, but they deserve to have something they can listen to in the car." Spears wrote the opening track "Shotgun Wedding" with Chris Tompkins in 2008 or 2009. She cites it as one of the first songs she ever wrote and represents the beginning stage of her music career. The second track "Run" Spears says originated from a conversation she had with some of her co-writers about how hot it was outside which eventually turned into a song. Spears says the song reminds her of "being on the river, summertime, just being with the person you love, and just having a good time." The lead single from the EP "How Could I Want More" was inspired by Spears' husband and is what she describes as "personal and special". "Mandolin Summer Sun" is what Spears describes as a happy song and is about "letting things go, not being so serious, enjoying life, and that innocence, and that fun time in the summer." The final track "Big Bad World" was written with Chris Tompkins. It was written when Spears was in a lonely time in her life and is meant to be encouraging to listeners.

Track listing

Chart performance

References

2014 debut EPs
Jamie Lynn Spears EPs